The 1992 Virginia Slims of Houston was a women's tennis tournament played on outdoor clay courts at the Westside Tennis Club in Houston, Texas in the United States that was part of Tier II of the 1992 WTA Tour. It was the 22nd edition of the tournament and was held from April 13 through April 19, 1992. First-seeded Monica Seles won the singles title and earned $70,000 first-prize money.

Finals

Singles
 Monica Seles defeated  Zina Garrison 6–1, 6–1
 It was Seles' 4th singles title of the year and the 24th of her career.

Doubles
 Patty Fendick /  Mary Joe Fernández defeated  Jill Hetherington /  Kathy Rinaldi 7–5, 6–4

External links
 ITF tournament edition details
 Tournament draws

Virginia Slims of Houston
Virginia Slims of Houston
Virginia Slims of Houston
Virginia Slims of Houston
Virginia Slims of Houston
Virginia Slims of Houston